Yarra Flats may refer to places in Victoria, Australia:

the former name of Yarra Glen
Yarra Flats Park on the Yarra River at Bulleen